The Kīlauea Caldera (Hawaiian: Kaluapele), officially gazetted as Kīlauea Crater, is a caldera located at the summit of Kīlauea, an active shield volcano in the Hawaiian Islands. It contains Halemaʻumaʻu, an active pit crater near the caldera's southwestern edge. 

The walls of the caldera consist of fault scarps that have formed as a result of down-sinking of the caldera floor. Much of the caldera floor is covered by lava flows erupted since the 19th century. The Hawaiian Volcano Observatory was established on the rim of the Kīlauea Caldera in 1912.

Outside of Halemaʻumaʻu, eruptions from the Kīlauea Caldera have taken place in 1982, 1975, 1974, 1971, 1921, 1919, 1918, and possibly in 1820 and 1790.

See also

 List of volcanoes in the Hawaiian – Emperor seamount chain

References

Kīlauea
Hawaiʻi Volcanoes National Park
Calderas of Hawaii
Holocene calderas